The 2021 Airdrie and Shotts by-election  was held in the UK parliament constituency of Airdrie and Shotts following the resignation of the sitting member (MP), Neil Gray, to run for the corresponding seat (which he subsequently won) in the 2021 Scottish Parliament election. This was necessitated by Scottish National Party (SNP) rules banning its members from sitting as an MSP and an MP at the same time. It took place on 13 May 2021, a week after the Scottish Parliament elections, to reduce COVID-19 transmission risk.

The by-election was the second to the 58th Parliament elected in 2019. This by-election ended a long lull between House of Commons by-elections in Scotland, with the last one having been held in Inverclyde in 2011. This was the first by-election to a Westminster constituency in which the SNP was the defending party. Anum Qaisar held the seat for the SNP with a decreased majority but an increased share of the vote.

Background 

Airdrie and Shotts is a generally working-class, urban seat, and contains the towns of Airdrie, Calderbank, Chapelhall, Glenmavis and Shotts. Previous MPs for the seat include the former Labour cabinet ministers Helen Liddell and John Reid, both of whom now sit in the House of Lords.

Neil Gray was elected as the Scottish National Party (SNP) MP for Airdrie and Shotts at the 2015 United Kingdom general election, and was re-elected in both 2017 and 2019. In November 2020, Gray announced that he would be resigning as an MP in order to try and win a seat in the Holyrood constituency of the same name at the 2021 Scottish Parliament election. On 23 March 2021, he made his final speech in the House of Commons, and was appointed Steward and Bailiff of the Manor of Northstead a day later.

Candidates
Jonathan Stanley had already been announced as the Scottish Unionist Party candidate for a potential Airdrie and Shotts by-election in September 2020.

On 18 March 2021, Anum Qaisar was selected as the SNP's candidate for the by-election. She was a Labour Party member until at least 2014, and was the general secretary of Muslim Friends of Labour. She had previously worked as a caseworker to an SNP MSP and as a parliamentary researcher to an SNP MP. At the time of declaring her candidacy she was a modern studies teacher.

On 25 March 2021, the councillor Kenneth Stevenson was selected by Scottish Labour to contend the by-election. He beat a former MP for the constituency and the chief executive of Scotland in Union, Pamela Nash.

The Scottish Liberal Democrat candidate was Stephen Arrundale, the party's treasurer. He had previously stood as a candidate for Midlothian in the 2019 General Election.

Result

2019 result 
Gray won the seat with an increased majority at the 2019 election.

References

2021 elections in the United Kingdom
2021 in Scotland
2020s elections in Scotland
Airdrie, North Lanarkshire
By-elections to the Parliament of the United Kingdom in Scottish constituencies
2021 Airdrie
2021 Airdrie
Shotts